Luis Marotte (born October 14, 1944) is an Uruguayan former footballer who played as a midfielder.

Career 
Marotte played in the National Soccer League in 1969 with Toronto Hellas. The following season he played in the North American Soccer League with Rochester Lancers. In his debut season he assisted Rochester in securing the double (Northern Division & Soccer Bowl), and contributed a goal in the final series against Washington Darts. He re-signed with Rochester for the 1971 season, but failed to make an appearance due to contractual obligations with a Mexican club he played with. In 1972, he played in the Primera División de México with C.D. Irapuato. 

In 1973, he played in the American Soccer League with Cincinnati Comets. In his debut season with Cincinnati he assisted in securing the Midwest Conference title, and featured in the ASL Championship final against New York Apollo. He returned to play in the NASL in 1974 to sign with Los Angeles Aztecs. During his tenure with Los Angeles he assisted in clinching the Western Division title, and winning the NASL Final against Miami Toros. He was also named to the NASL All-Star Second Team.

For the 1975 season he signed with San Antonio Thunder. After a single season in San Antonio he returned to play with Los Angeles Aztecs in 1976. Midway through the 1976 season he returned to the ASL to sign with Oakland Buccaneers. In 1977, he played in the Greater Los Angeles Soccer League with United Armenians.

Managerial career 
Marotte was the head coach for the United Armenians in the Greater Los Angeles Soccer League in 1980.

References  
 

Living people
1944 births
Association football midfielders
Uruguayan footballers
Uruguayan football managers
Rochester Lancers (1967–1980) players
Irapuato F.C. footballers
Cincinnati Comets players
Los Angeles Aztecs players
San Antonio Thunder players
Oakland Buccaneers players
Canadian National Soccer League players
North American Soccer League (1968–1984) players
American Soccer League (1933–1983) players
Footballers from Montevideo
Uruguayan expatriate footballers
Expatriate soccer players in Canada
Uruguayan expatriate sportspeople in Canada